Nye County is a county in the U.S. state of Nevada. As of the 2020 census, the population was 51,591. Its county seat is Tonopah. At , Nye is Nevada's largest county by area and the third-largest county in the contiguous United States, behind Coconino County of Arizona and San Bernardino County of California.

Nye County comprises the Pahrump micropolitan statistical area, which is included in the Las Vegas-Henderson combined statistical area.

In 2010, Nevada's center of population was in southern Nye County, near Yucca Mountain.

The Nevada Test Site and proposed Yucca Mountain nuclear waste repository are in southwestern Nye County, and are the focus of a great deal of controversy. The federal government manages 92% of the county's land. A 1987 attempt to stop the nuclear waste site resulted in the creation of Bullfrog County, Nevada, which was dissolved two years later.

The county has several environmentally sensitive areas, including Ash Meadows National Wildlife Refuge, the White River Valley, several Great Basin sky islands, and part of Death Valley National Park. Visitors to Death Valley often stay at Beatty or Amargosa Valley.

Nye County is one of 10 Nevada counties where prostitution is legal. The county has no incorporated cities.

History
Nye County was established during the American Civil War in 1864 and named after James W. Nye, the first governor of the Nevada Territory and later a U.S. Senator after it was admitted as a state. The first county seat was Ione in 1864, followed by Belmont in 1867, and finally Tonopah in 1905.

The county's first boom came in the early 20th century, when Rhyolite and Tonopah, as well as Goldfield in nearby Esmeralda County, had gold- and silver-mining booms. In 1906, Goldfield had 30,000 residents, Tonopah nearly 10,000, and Rhyolite peaked at about 10,000. These cities were linked by the Tonopah and Tidewater Railroad.

After the boom died, Nye County withered. By 1910, the population had plummeted to about 7,500 before sinking to near 3,000 in the middle of the century. With development at the military test site and increasing employment and resources, the population stabilized. After the 1990s, when Pahrump became a bedroom community for Las Vegas, it had high rates of population growth.

Periodically, discussions have arisen of moving the county seat to Pahrump, or splitting off the southern portion of the county, but neither of these ideas appears to have sufficient support in the county or state government.

From 1987 to 1989, Bullfrog County, Nevada, was split off from Nye County to form a separate political region. Its population was zero; its creation was an attempt to stop a nuclear waste storage facility from being built in the region.

Geography
The highest and most topographically prominent mountain in the county is Mount Jefferson at 11,949 feet (3,642 m).

Nye County is in south-central Nevada. It is Nevada's largest county and the third-largest county in the contiguous United States, after San Bernardino County in California and Coconino County in Arizona. Of this vast land area, only , or just over 7%, is private land; most of it is public land managed by the federal government. Before the Treaty of Ruby Valley, the whole area was controlled by the Western Shoshone people, who say they never ceded territory here.

Many Pahrump residents commute  each way to Las Vegas via Nevada State Route 160, which for much of its length is a four-lane divided highway.

Major highways
Nye County has a long stretch of U.S. Route 95, the main road connecting Las Vegas with the state capital, Carson City. Beatty and Tonopah both rely heavily on through traffic to sustain their economies. As of 2006, an average of 2,000 cars daily traveled U.S. 95 near Tonopah.

  Interstate 11 (Future)
  U.S. Route 6
  U.S. Route 95
  State Route 160
  State Route 267
  State Route 318
  State Route 361
  State Route 372
  State Route 373
  State Route 374
  State Route 375
  State Route 376
  State Route 377
  State Route 379
  State Route 844

Adjacent counties

 Churchill County - northwest
 Lander County - north
 Eureka County - north
 White Pine County - northeast
 Lincoln County - east
 Clark County - east
 Esmeralda County - west
 Mineral County - west
 Inyo County, California - south

National protected areas
 Ash Meadows National Wildlife Refuge
 Death Valley National Park (part)
 Humboldt-Toiyabe National Forest (part)
 Spring Mountains National Recreation Area (part)

Demographics

2000 census
At the 2000 census there were 32,485 people, 13,309 households, and 9,063 families in the county. The population density was 2 people per square mile (1/km2). There were 15,934 housing units at an average density of 1 per square mile (0/km2).  The racial makeup of the county was 90.0% White, 1.18% Black or African American, 1.96% Native American, 0.78% Asian, 0.32% Pacific Islander, 2.98% from other races, and 3.15% from two or more races. 8.35%. were Hispanic or Latino of any race.

In 2006 there were 42,693 people living in Nye County, representing a growth of 31.3% since 2000. This was slightly faster growth rate than recorded during the same period for Clark County, where Las Vegas is located.

Even as the Pahrump area grew thanks to its proximity to Las Vegas, the racial makeup of Nye County was very different from that of Clark County. Non-Hispanic whites now constitute 82.7% of the county population. African-Americans were now 1.7% of the population, which meant actual increase of the number of African Americans residing in the county was over 50%. Native Americans were only 1.8% of the population now. Asians were a full one percent of the population. Pacific Islanders were 0.5% of the population and Latinos made up 11.0% of the population.

Of the 13,309 households 16.40% had children under the age of 18 living with them, 26.30% were married couples living together, 7.40% had a female householder with no husband present, and 31.90% were non-families. 25.70% of households were one person and 10.30% were one person aged 65 or older. The average household size was 2.42 and the average family size was 2.90.

The age distribution was 3.70% under the age of 18, 5.40% from 18 to 24, 24.00% from 25 to 44, 58.50% from 45 to 64, and 18.40% 65 or older. The median age was 43 years. For every 100 females there were 105.10 males. For every 100 females age 18 and over, there were 104.70 males.

The county's median household income was $36,024, and the median family income was $41,642. Males had a median income of $37,276 versus $22,394 for females. The county's per capita income was $17,962. About 7.30% of families and 10.70% of the population were below the poverty line, including 13.10% of those under age 18 and 8.30% of those age 65 or over.

Like many rural counties of the western United States, Nye County experiences a relatively high suicide rate. According to the Centers for Disease Control, the annual suicide rate in Nye County averaged 28.7561 per 100,000 people during 1989–1998, the most recent period for which data is available. This was the third-highest rate among Nevada counties, behind White Pine (34.3058) and Lyon County (30.8917), but ahead of the overall rate of 22.96 for Nevada, which leads the nation.

2010 census
At the 2010 census, there were 43,946 people, 18,032 households, and 11,929 families in the county. The racial makeup of the county was 85.9% white, 2.0% black or African American, 1.6% American Indian, 1.3% Asian, 0.5% Pacific islander, 5.2% from other races, and 3.5% from two or more races. Those of Hispanic or Latino origin made up 13.6% of the population. In terms of ancestry, 18.6% were German, 15.8% were English, 14.7% were Irish, 10.3% were American, and 6.1% were Italian.

Of the 18,032 households, 25.1% had children under the age of 18 living with them, 51.5% were married couples living together, 9.3% had a female householder with no husband present, 33.8% were non-families, and 26.8% of households were made up of individuals. The average household size was 2.42 and the average family size was 2.90. The median age was 48.4 years.

The median household income was $41,181 and the median family income  was $50,218. Males had a median income of $51,574 versus $32,152 for females. The per capita income for the county was $22,687. About 14.2% of families and 18.9% of the population were below the poverty line, including 27.8% of those under age 18 and 9.8% of those age 65 or over.

Education
The Nye County School District serves all of Nye County and Esmeralda County. The Districts Headquarters is in the county seat of Tonopah. The superintendent of the NCSD is Dr. Warren Shillingburg.

Communities

Unincorporated towns 

 Amargosa Valley
 Beatty
 Gabbs
 Manhattan
 Pahrump
 Round Mountain
 Tonopah (county seat)

Unincorporated communities 

 Carvers
 Crystal
 Currant
 Duckwater
 Hadley
 Mercury
 Scotty's Junction
 Sunnyside
 Tybo
 Yomba

Ghost towns

 Belmont
 Bonnie Claire
 Bullfrog
 Berlin
 Cactus Springs
 Carrara
 Gold Center
 Grantsville
 Ione
 Lockes
 Nyala
 Pioneer
 Potts
 Rhyolite
 Warm Springs

Politics

In popular culture
Nye County was the one of the primary broadcast locations of American veteran radio broadcaster Art Bell, who was famous for creating and hosting Coast to Coast AM, Art Bell's Dark Matter and "Midnight in the Desert", the last of which is still broadcast on the Dark Matter Digital Network by a replacement host, Dave Schrader, chosen by Bell. He lived in the county until his death on April 13, 2018.

See also

 National Register of Historic Places listings in Nye County, Nevada
 South Egan Range Wilderness
 Weepah Spring Wilderness

References

External links
 
 Nye County Nuclear Waste Repository Project Office
 Nye County and Census Tract 9805, Nye County, Nevada United States Census Bureau

 
1864 establishments in Nevada
Populated places established in 1864